Anton Emmerich Zischka von Trochnov was an Austrian journalist and one of the most successful non-fiction writers in the 20th century. Born in September 14, 1904 and he died in May 31, 1997) He also wrote under the pseudonyms Rupert Donkan, Thomas Daring, Darius Plecha and Antal Sorba. His some 40 books that mostly covered non-fictional economic and technical topics have been translated into 18 languages.

Life 

The multilingual Zischka was working for Neue Freien Presse from 1924 to 1929 and from 1930 in Paris as correspondent for different European and American newspapers. His big success as a journalist allowed him e.g. to buy and use a private airplane, which allowed him to report internationally. His writings about the China flood disaster of 1931 have been covered by nearly all European newspapers. Zischka worked as a freelance author since the success of his first book Le Monde en Folie 1933 and stayed with his Dutch wife from 1935 till his death 1997 on their own finca in San Vicente, Majorca. Parts of Zischka's private archive are now to be found in Deutsches Museum Munich.

Describing travels and industry experience

Start of the 1930s, Zischka reports about foreign countries and global industries (Zischka worked under cover in Belgian coal mines and Romanian oil fields) promoted connoisseurship and authenticity. He found a broad audience in Nazi Germany but as well abroad.

The growth and success of the Goldmann publishing house in Leipzig was mainly based on the success of Zischka's bestsellers which are different from, for instance, :de:Karl Aloys Schenzinger, a more fictional Raw Material bestseller written during the Third Reich. Zischka remained in Spain (and staunchly adhered to non-fiction) and found international praise as well. Zischka finally found (after some vain efforts) a sponsor within the Nazi elite, Fritz Todt. The latter introduced Wissenschaft bricht Monopole (1936) as text book in secondary schools and made Zischka a household name within the regime. The book was translated in 18 languages and sold worldwide.

Serving the Third Reich propaganda effort 

Similar to "Ölkrieg", Zischka explained the background of war and armed conflict as simple struggles for land and raw materials. Zischka presented German technical developments as Coal fluidization or the (Haber process) as being able to guarantee peace. He juxtaposed the greedy capitalism of British or American monopolies against the German orderly working, organic "Volksgemeinschaft" willing to share its technology. Against an Anglo-Saxon democratic public, a society dominated by mass media and party politics Zischka put his (very German) ideal of an organic synthesis, a common Gemeinschaft based on a broad mass movement led by technocrats deciding on efficiency criteria.

Zischka served widespread then German credentials. Zischka avoided blunt antisemitism and outspoken chauvinism, which allowed him to draw a peaceful and "modern" picture of the Third Reich, serving exactly the latter's prewar propaganda aims. That eased as well Zischka's postwar stance as a nonapolitical, peaceful technocrat. However, Zischka joined the NSDAP in 1940 and was a member of Deutsche Arbeitsfront. He also trained and instructed Legion Condor forces and provided dossiers about the Spanish political situation to Nazi government authorities.

Impact on public debate in the Third Reich

Zischka's publications enhanced a public debate about measurements to increase energy autarky and lead to the construction (against the will of the German petrochemical industry) of several coal fluidization plants in Germany. In real life, those plants served not for global peace but provided gasoline for the Wehrmacht Blitzkriegs.

Restart and further success after 1945

An allied order for repatriation lead to Zischka's internment after 1945. Zischka managed to  get back to writing activities with Bertelsmann (using a pseudonym first) and reestablished again a legal foothold in Spain within 1948. Further bestsellers followed, Zischka went famous as well through public lectures in Germany. His main topics stayed energy and industry, but he wrote as well about the role of the dollar in the global economy. The latter topic Zischka presented as a controversy between annotated Anglo-Saxon profiteering and war mongering against a peace power of (not longer German) but European origin.

Zischka as source of ideas for globalization critics 

Zischka's success was not only due to excellent writing style, personal commitment and ambition and well searched facts. He was excellent in choosing topics of upcoming broad interest (as energy supply) and describing them with a provocative and interest catching prose. His journalistic methods have found different heirs, from Günter Wallraff to Peter Scholl-Latour. His points and argumentations are still to be found and active in different part of the German political spectrum and debate.

As an example, Zischka's paradigm of dollar-imperialism and war about oil are to be found with nowadays German non-fiction authors of different origins: 
. 
  F. William Engdahl, a Büso related journalist and author of "Mit der Ölwaffe zur Weltmacht" ("The oil weapon leading to global power")
 Hans Kronberger, former Member of the European Parliament for Austrian right wing FPÖparty, author of "Blut für Öl" (Blood for oil), the preface of the book written by SPD-Solar Guru Hermann Scheer
 Franz Alt, former member of CDU, fore runner of the Peace Movement  and author of "Krieg um Öl oder Frieden durch die Sonne" ("War about oil or solar peace")

A similarity to Zischka is the lineup of an alleged oil greedy (Jewish) American  plutocracy and war-mongering globalization against a future peaceful European technocracy. Instead of Zischka's zest for coal fluidization, nowadays authors promote switching to solar energy supply and hydrogen economy as technocratic deus-ex-machina leading to global peace.

A somewhat more sophisticated reasoning about deeper causes of armed conflicts - as e.g. local social struggles, cultural and religious unrest and differences are completely neglected. Instead, Zischka and his followers set up a popular and easy digestible amalgam of pauschalities and combined anti-Americanism, anti-Globalization with a radiating technocratic vision. It does neither fit into classical left - right political schemes nor does it help to solve any real existing conflict (compare Kosovo).

Selected bibliography 
 Anton Zischka: Der Kampf um die Weltmacht Öl, Goldmann, Leipzig 1934
 Anton Zischka: Der Kampf um die Weltmacht Baumwolle, Goldmann, Leipzig 1935
 Anton Zischka: Abessinien, "das letzte ungelöste Problem Afrikas". Goldmann, Bern, Leipzig 1935
 Anton Zischka: Japan in der Welt, 1936
 Anton Zischka: Wissenschaft bricht Monopole. Der Forscherkampf um neue Rohstoffe und neuen Lebensraum . Goldmann, Leipzig 1936
 Anton Zischka: Brot für 2 Milliarden Menschen - Der Kampf um die Nahrung der Welt, Goldmann Verlag, Leipzig 1938
 Anton Zischka: Ölkrieg, Goldmann Verlag, Leipzig 1939
 Anton Zischka: Englands Bündnisse, Goldmann Verlag, Leipzig 1940
 Anton Zischka: Sieg der Arbeit - Geschichte des fünftausendjährigen Kampfes gegen Unwissenheit und Sklaverei, Goldmann, Leipzig 1941
 Anton Zischka: Die Auferstehung Arabiens, 1942
 Anton Zischka: Die Welt bleibt reich, 1952
 Anton Zischka: Kohle im Atomzeitalter, Bertelsmann, 1961
 Anton Zischka: Das Ende des amerikanischen Jahrhunderts, 1972; Stalling, Oldenburg 1985, 
 Anton Zischka: Kampf ums Überleben. Das Menschenrecht auf Energie, Econ, München 1979, 
 Antal Sorba: Die große Schröpfung. 5000 Jahre Wirtschaft trotz Finanzamt, Econ, München 1985, 
 Anton Zischka: Der Dollar, Glanz und Elend der Weltwährung, Langen Müller/Herbig, 1986; Akt. Neuausgabe 1995, 
 Anton Zischka: Tschernobyl - kein Zufall. Sowjetwirtschaft und die Fehler des Westens, Universitas, München 1987, 
 Anton Zischka: Die alles treibende Kraft. Weltgeschichte der Energie, 1988,

References

1904 births
1997 deaths
Austrian male writers
Writers from Vienna
Condor Legion personnel
20th-century Austrian journalists